Janet Lawless née Wienand (born 15 May 1985) is a South African athlete competing in the heptathlon and 400 metres hurdles.

Competition record

Personal bests
200 m – 25.38 (+0.5) (Nairobi 2010)
400 m – 53.61 (Pretoria 2008)
800 m – 2:17.76 (Réduit 2011)
100 m hurdles – 13.83 (-0.5) (Kladno 2011)
400 m hurdles – 56.01 (Pretoria 2006)
High jump – 1.76 (Réduit 2011)
Long jump – 5.83 (+1.9) (Nairobi 2010)
Shot put – 11.49 (Réduit 2011)
Javelin throw – 38.12 (Nairobi 2010)
Heptathlon – 5736 (Réduit 2010)

External links

1985 births
Living people
South African female hurdlers
South African heptathletes
Competitors at the 2009 Summer Universiade
Competitors at the 2011 Summer Universiade
Athletes (track and field) at the 2007 All-Africa Games
African Games competitors for South Africa